Lancashire County Council elections are held every four years. Lancashire County Council is the upper-tier authority for the non-metropolitan county of Lancashire in England. Since the last boundary changes in 2017, 84 councillors have been elected from 82 electoral divisions.

Political control
Lancashire County Council was first created in 1889. Its territory, powers and responsibilities were significantly reformed under the Local Government Act 1972, with a new council elected in 1973, initially acting as a shadow authority ahead of the new arrangements coming into effect on 1 April 1974. Since 1973, political control of the council has been held by the following parties:

Leadership
The leaders of the council since 1974 have been:

Council elections
1973 Lancashire County Council election
1977 Lancashire County Council election
1981 Lancashire County Council election (new division boundaries)
1985 Lancashire County Council election
1989 Lancashire County Council election
1993 Lancashire County Council election
1997 Lancashire County Council election
2001 Lancashire County Council election
2005 Lancashire County Council election (new division boundaries)
2009 Lancashire County Council election
2013 Lancashire County Council election
2017 Lancashire County Council election (new division boundaries)
2021 Lancashire County Council election

County result maps

By-election results

Elections in the 1990s

Elections in the 2000s

Elections in the 2010s

References

External links
Lancashire Council

 
Council elections in Lancashire
County council elections in England